DSV Victoria  was a football club from Zemun (nowadays Serbia), Belgrade. Local Germans from Zemun and other parts of Syrmia mainly played for the club.

Name 
Its name literally means German Sport Society "Victoria".

History 
This squad was founded before 1939, and competed in the unfinished 1941 football championship of the Independent State of Croatia.

In that season, the club took 8th place, the penultimate position.  In the 1942 Croatian First League, Victoria ended the competition in the first group stage. Victoria finished last in Group C, behind squads from Osijek Hajduk, HŠK Građanski Osijek, Radnik Osijek and city rival Građanski.

After the end of the Second World War, the club was disbanded, as it was the case with other clubs that competed in the championship of wartime Croatia.

Sources 
 Croatia Domestic Football Full Tables

 

Football clubs in Yugoslavia
Defunct football clubs in Serbia
German diaspora in Europe
Syrmia